Wrestling at the 26th Southeast Asian Games will be held in Palembang, Indonesia.

Medal summary

Men's Greco-Roman

Men's freestyle

Women's freestyle

Medal table

Wrest
Southeast American Games
2011